The twenty-third series of Geordie Shore, a British television programme based in Newcastle upon Tyne was confirmed on 15 February 2022, when Paramount+ introduced their new lineup of unscripted series and renewals for MTV Entertainment Studios, including the show's new spin-off, although they were scheduled to start in late 2020 and 2021 but have been postponed several times due to UK COVID-19 restrictions. Filming locations include a trip to the Algarve in Portugal, Ibiza and Newcastle upon Tyne. The first trailer for the season was released in late August 2022 and premiered later that year on September 20. This was the final series to feature Marty McKenna after he was suspended from MTV.This series appears as "Geordie Shore: The Reunion Series" and not as a spin off of the show. This series brings together the cast members to celebrate Geordie Shore's 10th anniversary.

Cast 

MTV reunited original cast members Charlotte Crosby, Holly Hagan, Sophie Kasaei, James Tindale, and Jay Gardner nearly 11 years after filming the first series. Greg Lake made a brief appearance while Vicky Pattison and Gaz Beadle were absent from the reunion.

This ten year reunion special also featured veterans Ricci Guarnaccio, Scott Timlin, Marnie Simpson, Kyle Christie and Aaron Chalmers, also Zahida Allen and Chantelle Connelly, making their return, while Chloe Ferry, Nathan Henry, Bethan Kershaw, Abbie Holborn, Anthony Kenney, Louis Shaw, Amelia Lily and Marty McKenna returned from series 22.  

Former cast members Faith Mullen, Tahlia Chung, Natalie Phillips anda Stephanie Snowdon made appearances during the series, together with rookies Devon Nathaniel Reid, Jade Affleck, Harrison Campbell, Ruby Torre, Jay Baker and Roxy Johnson from Geordie Shore: Hot Single Summer.

Duration of cast 

  = Cast member is featured in this episode.
  = Cast member leaves the series.
  = Cast member returns to the series.
  = Cast member does not feature in this episode.
  = Cast member features in this episode despite not being an official cast member at the time.
  = Cast member is not officially a cast member in this episode.

Episodes

Ratings

References 

2022 British television seasons
Geordie Shore
Television shows set in Spain
Television shows set in Portugal
Television shows set in Newcastle upon Tyne